Steven Rosenblum is an American film editor with over twenty feature film credits dating from 1987. He has had an extended, notable collaboration with the director Edward Zwick, and has edited all of his films since Glory (1989).

Life and career
Rosenblum is a 1976 graduate of the American Film Institute Conservatory. His collaborator Edward Zwick was a 1975 graduate.

Among the films edited by Rosenblum are Dangerous Beauty (1996), X-Men (2000), and Failure to Launch (2006).

Rosenblum has won two American Cinema Editors "Eddie Awards" for Glory and for Braveheart (1995). He has been nominated three times for the Academy Award for Best Film Editing (for Glory, Braveheart, and Blood Diamond).

Rosenblum has been elected to membership in the American Cinema Editors, and is the 2011 recipient of the Franklin J. Schaffner Alumni Medal of the American Film Institute Conservatory.

Filmography
Feature films
 The Journey of Natty Gann (1985)
 Steele Justice (1987)
 Wild Thing (1987)
 Glory (1989)
 Jack the Bear (1993)
 Legends of the Fall (1994)
 Braveheart (1995)
 Courage Under Fire (1996)
 Dangerous Beauty (1998)
 The Siege (1998)
 X-Men (2000)
 Pearl Harbor (2001)
 The Four Feathers (2002)
 The Last Samurai (2003)
 XXX: State of the Union (2005)
 Blood Diamond (2006)
 Failure to Launch (2006)
 Defiance (2008)
 Journey to the Center of the Earth (2008)
 Love & Other Drugs (2010)
 Get the Gringo (2012)
 After Earth (2013)
 Pawn Sacrifice (2014)
 Blood Father (2016)
 The Promise (2016)
 The Birth of a Nation (2016)
 Woman Walks Ahead (2017)
 Trial by Fire (2018)
 Medieval (2022)

See also
 List of film director and editor collaborations

References

Further reading
 . Posted September 9, 2014 by the American Film Institute.

External links
 

American Cinema Editors
Living people
1954 births
American film editors